Joseph B. Whelehan (19 May 1882 – 29 October 1968) was an Irish politician, scout leader and teacher. He was born in Tyrrellspass, County Westmeath, the son of grocery shopkeeper Michael Whelehan and Jane Gavin. He was married in Tuam in April 1918 to Mary Philomena Waldron.

He was organiser of the Sinn Féin Club in Tuam. He was elected unopposed as a Sinn Féin Teachta Dála (TD) to the 2nd Dáil at the 1921 elections for the Galway constituency. He supported the Anglo-Irish Treaty and voted in favour of it. He was elected as a pro-Treaty Sinn Féin TD at the 1922 general election. He did not contest the 1923 general election. He served as Chair of the Prices Commission during his service in the 2nd Dáil.

Whelehan was a secondary school teacher at St Jarlath's College in Tuam, County Galway. He served as Chief Scout of the Catholic Boy Scouts of Ireland from 1930 until 1962, and was instrumental in the purchase of Larch Hill as the National Campsite.

References

1968 deaths
Early Sinn Féin TDs
Members of the 2nd Dáil
Members of the 3rd Dáil
People of the Irish Civil War (Pro-Treaty side)
Politicians from County Galway
1882 births